Vaceuchelus abdii is a species of sea snail, a marine gastropod mollusc in the family Chilodontidae.

Description
The height of the shell attains 2 mm.

Distribution
This marine species occurs off the Philippines.

References

External links
 

abdii
Gastropods described in 2006